Outes is a municipality in the province of A Coruña in the autonomous community of Galicia in northwestern Spain. It has a population of 6,155 (Spanish 2020 Census) and an area of 100 km². 

The Cando event happened in 1994 within the boundaries of Cando, in the parish of San Tirso. The municipality has five peaks ranging over 500 m, the highest being Monte Tremuzo.

References

Municipalities in the Province of A Coruña